Shortanbay (Şortanbai, شورتانباي; , Shortanbay) is a town in Atyrau Region, west Kazakhstan.

References

Atyrau Region
Cities and towns in Kazakhstan